Vieste Cathedral is a Roman Catholic co-cathedral in Vieste, a former bishopric in Apulia, southern Italy.

History 
It was built in Apulian Romanesque style as a cathedral when Vieste was still a Latin Catholic diocese (until its merger into the present Roman Catholic Archdiocese of Manfredonia–Vieste–San Giovanni Rotondo on 1818.06.27).
 
It is dedicated to the Assumption of Mary. It has a basilica plan with a nave and two aisles. Its bell tower was rebuilt in Baroque style in the 18th century after the previous one collapsed.

The co-cathedral of Viesti became a minor basilica by decree of Pope John Paul II on 12 February 1981.

Notes and references

Sources and external links
 GCatholic, with Google satellite picture

Roman Catholic cathedrals in Italy
Cathedrals in Apulia
Churches in the province of Foggia
11th-century Roman Catholic church buildings in Italy
Vieste